Tropical Storm Danas, known in the Philippines as Tropical Storm Falcon, was the fifth named tropical cyclone of the 2019 Pacific typhoon season.

Storm history 

On July 11, a low-pressure zone formed near the Mariana Islands, and the United States Naval Research Laboratory began tracking the system. On the morning of July 14, the Japan Meteorological Agency (JMA) upgraded it to a tropical depression. At this point the system moved westward. At 8 pm, the Joint Typhoon Warning Center gave the system a low chance for tropical cyclogenesis. On the morning of July 15, the JMA issued a gale warning, and the Central Weather Bureau (CWB) of Taiwan upgraded it to a tropical depression. On the same day, the Hong Kong Observatory upgraded the storm to a tropical depression.

At 6:30 am on July 16, the Joint Typhoon Warning Center upgraded the rating to "High" and issued a tropical cyclone warning. The Joint Typhoon Warning Center raised the system to a tropical depression at 2:40 pm, giving the number 06W. At 3 pm on the same day, the Japan Meteorological Agency upgraded it to a tropical storm, naming it Danas, followed by the China Meteorological Center, the CWB, and PAGASA also upgraded it to a tropical storm. The Joint Typhoon Warning Center was upgraded to a tropical storm late that night.

On July 19, the JMA reported that Danas had reached its peak wind speeds with maximum 10-minute sustained winds of 85 km/h (50 mph). Later that day, Danas began to weaken. On July 20, around 13:00 UTC, Danas made landfall in South Korea as a minimal tropical storm, before weakening into a tropical depression soon afterward. The weakening trend also accelerated on July 20 due to the drop in sea surface temperatures to  near landfall. The Republic of Korea Meteorological Administration downgraded Danas to a tropical depression at 11 am and stopped issuing announcements. At 12:45 UTC on July 21, Danas transitioned into an extratropical low in the Sea of Japan, and the JMA issued their final advisory on the storm.

Impact

Philippines 
In the Philippines, four people were killed after Danas triggered flooding in the country. Agricultural damage in Negros Occidental were calculated at ₱19 million (US$372,000), while agricultural damage in Lanao Norte reached ₱277.8 million (US$5.44 million).

South Korea
Danas caused stormy weather across South Korea; however, its effects were relatively minor. A man died after being swept away by strong waves in Geochang County. Damage in South Jeolla Province were at W395 million (US$336,000), while damage in Jeju Island up to W322 million (US$274,000). Additionally, Danas also triggered flash flooding in Kyushu. An 11-year-old boy was killed.

Japan 
Danas brought heavy rainfall to many western parts of Japan including nearly all of Kyushu. In addition, the amount of rain that fell in the last 24 hours exceeded 350 mm in various places in Goto, and reaches the rainfall for July 1 month in normal years, and it has become the largest since July.

See also

Tropical cyclones in 2019

References 

Danas
Danas